Al-Nasir Muhammad Salah al-Din or al-Nasir li Din Allah Muhammad Salah al-Din ibn Ali al-Mahdi (Arabic: الناصر لدين الله محمد صلاح الدين بن علي المهدي ) (4 September 1338 – 2 November 1391) was an imam of Yemen who ruled during the period 1372–1391. He was a Zaydi imam and a descendant of the Islamic prophet Muhammad.

Biography 

Al-Nasir Muhammad Salah al-Din was a son of Ali al-Mahdi ibn Muhammad, who was an imam of Yemen who ruled during the period 1349–1372.

In the first half of 14th century, several imams had disputed the succession. About the middle of the century, his father Ali al-Mahdi ibn Muhammad attained considerable influence, which was however reduced before his death in Dhamar in 1372. Al-Nasir Muhammad Salah al-Din became the sole Zaydi imam of Yemen. However, the important city San'a was in the hands of a Zaidi family that ruled as emirs. In the year after his accession, al-Nasir Muhammad Salah al-Din attempted to seize San'a, but was unable to penetrate the strong defences. Instead, he resorted to strategy. He married the mother of the emir Idris bin Abdallah, but when Idris came to meet his new step-father, the latter arrested him and then marched into San'a in full force, in 1381. Idris and his mother were allowed to live in the city, but had no further contact with the imam. Al-Nasir Muhammad Salah al-Din was a comparatively successful ruler; he advanced as far as the Tihama in the coastland of South Arabia, moving against the Rasulids. In 1391 he was thrown off his mule and dragged along, receiving fatal injuries. When he died in San'a, his death was concealed for two months on account of insecurity. He is buried in the Salah al-Din Mosque, built on his initiative. He was the husband of as-Sayyidah Fatimah, daughter of the headman of the Kurds in Dhamar, who built the al-Abhar Mosque in San'a. The death of al-Nasir was followed by internal turmoil among the Zaydi elite, but control over San'a was soon acquired by his young son al-Mansur Ali bin Salah al-Din.

His literary work 

Al-Nasir Muhammad Salah al-Din wrote a commentary on al-Zamakhshari's al-Kalim al-Nawabigh. He titled his work al-Hikam al-Sawabigh fi al-Kalim al-Nawabigh. In the same period of time, al-Taftazani (d. 1390) wrote also a commentary on al-Zamakhshari's work with slightly different title: al-Ni'am al-Sawabigh fi al-Kalim al-Nawabigh.

See also 

Imams of Yemen
Zaydism

References

Zaydi imams of Yemen
1338 births
1391 deaths
14th century in Yemen
14th-century Arabs
Rassid dynasty